This article lists the main modern pentathlon events and their results for 2013.

2014 YOG qualification events
 September 20 – 23: YOG 2014 Continental Qualifier - Europe in  Caldas da Rainha
 Youth Individual winners:  Danila Glavatskikh (m) /  Aurelija Tamasauskaite (f)
 Youth Mixed Team Relay winners:  (Yana Polishchuk & Vladyslav Rydvanskyi)
 September 27 & 28: YOG 2014 Continental Qualifier - Asia & Oceania in  Astana
 Youth Individual winners:  LI Shuhuan (m) /  WEI Danni (f)
 Youth Men's Team Relay winners:  (CHEN Shixing, LI Shuhuan, XU Zhuocheng, & PENG Shiyi)
 Youth Women's Team Relay winners:  (WEI Danni, ZHENG Lishan, ZHONG Xiuting, & SHAO Xiaoyu)
 Youth Mixed Team Relay winners: 
 Youth Men's Team winners:  (XU Zhuocheng, CHEN Shixing, & LI Shuhuan)
 Youth Women's Team winners:  (SHAO Xiaoyu, ZHONG Xiuting, & WEI Danni)
 November 8 – 10: YOG 2014 Continental Qualifier - Africa in  Abidjan
 Youth Individual winners:  Sherif Nazeir (m) /  Sondos Aboubakr (f)
 Youth Mixed Team Relay winners: 
 Youth Men's Team winners:  (Abdelrahman Alian, Youssef Abdelaziz, & Sherif Nazeir)
 Youth Women's Team winners:  (Nada Elhodhod, Haydy Morsy, & Sondos Aboubakr)
 November 30 & December 1: YOG 2014 Continental Qualifier - Pan America in  Acapulco
 Youth Individual winners:  Ricardo Vera (m) /  Anna Zs. Toth (f)
 Youth Women's Team winners:  (Xochitl Olivares, Martha Derrant, & Maria Ramirez)

World modern pentathlon championships
 July 25 – 30: 2013 World Junior Modern Pentathlon Championships in  Székesfehérvár
 Junior Individual winners:  Denys Pavlyuk (m) /  Zsófia Földházi (f)
 Junior Men's Team Relay winners:  (Valentin Belaud, Alexandre Henrard, & Andy Genard)
 Junior Women's Team Relay winners:  (Joanna Muir, Alice Fitton, & Kerry Prise)
 Junior Mixed Team Relay winners:  (Katsiaryna Arol & Dzianis Zeliankevich)
 Junior Men's Team winners:  (Istvan Malits, Bence Harangozo, & Gergely Demeter)
 Junior Women's Team winners:  (Mariana Arceo, Mayan Oliver, & Tamara Vega)
 August 8 – 12: 2013 World Youth "A" Modern Pentathlon Championships in  Wuhan
 Youth Individual winners:  Christian Zillekens (m) /  Ieva Serapinaitė (f)
 Youth Men's Team Relay winners:  (Jun Woong-tae, LEE Ji-hun, & LEE Dong-gi)
 Youth Women's Team Relay winners:  (WEI Danni, SHAO Xiaoyu, & ZHONG Xiuting)
 Youth Mixed Team Relay winners:  (Sofia Serkina & Alexander Lifanov)
 Youth Men's Team winners:  (Gergő Bruckmann, Krisztian Strobl, & Soma Tomaschof)
 Youth Women's Team winners:  (ZHONG Xiuting, SHAO Xiaoyu, & WEI Danni)
 August 19 – 28: 2013 World Modern Pentathlon Championships in  Kaohsiung
 Individual winners:  Justinas Kinderis (m) /  Laura Asadauskaitė (f)
 Men's Team Relay winners:  (Bence Demeter, Róbert Kasza, & Ádám Marosi)
 Women's Team Relay winners:  (Ganna Buriak, Iryna Khokhlova, & Victoria Tereshchuk)
 Mixed Team Relay winners:  (Élodie Clouvel & Valentin Belaud)
 Men's Team winners:  (Jean Maxence Berrou, Christopher Patte, & Valentin Prades)
 Women's Team winners:  (Kate French, Samantha Murray, & Mhairi Spence)

Continental modern pentathlon championships
 June 12 – 16: 2013 European Youth "B" Modern Pentathlon Championships (Tetrathlon) in  Minsk
 Youth Individual winners:  Alexandr Stepachev (m) /  İlke Özyüksel (f)
 Youth Men's Team Relay winners:  (Alexandr Stepachev, Igor Krivitckii, & Ivan Tarasov)
 Youth Women's Team Relay winners:  (Adelina Ibatullina, Arina Koritcina, & Ekaterina Utina)
 Youth Mixed Team Relay winners:  (Xeina Fralcova & Serge Baranov)
 Youth Men's Team winners:  (Timur Galimov, Serge Baranov, & Alexandr Stepachev)
 Youth Women's Team winners:  (Ekaterina Utina, Adelina Ibatullina, & Xeina Fralcova)
 June 18 – 24: 2013 European Junior Modern Pentathlon Championships in  Sofia
 Junior Individual winners:  Egor Puchkarevskiy (m) /  Katsiaryna Arol (f)
 Junior Men's Team Relay winners:  (Dmitry Suslov, Alexander Kukarin, & Danil Kalimullin)
 Junior Women's Team Relay winners:  (Pulcherie Delhalle, Julie Belhamri, & Adele Stern)
 Junior Mixed Team Relay winners:  (Gulnaz Gubaydullina & Ilya Shugarov)
 Junior Men's Team winners:  (Oleg Naumov, Kirill Belyakov, & Egor Puchkarevskiy)
 Junior Women's Team winners:  (Alexandra Savvina, Gulnaz Gubaydullina, & Anastasia Bugrina)
 July 11 – 14: 2013 NORCECA Senior & Junior Modern Pentathlon Championships in  Santo Domingo
 Individual winners:  José Figueroa (m) /  Leydi Moya (f)
 Junior Individual winners:  Charles Fernandez (m) /  Leydi Moya (f)
 July 11 – 17: 2013 European Modern Pentathlon Championships in  Drzonków
 Individual winners:  Ádám Marosi (m) /  Zsófia Földházi (f)
 Men's Team Relay winners:  (Valentin Belaud, Geoffrey Megi, & Valentin Prades)
 Women's Team Relay winners:  (Samantha Murray, Kate French, & Katy Burke)
 Mixed Team Relay winners:  (Victoria Tereshchuk & Pavlo Tymoshchenko)
 Men's Team winners:  (Bence Demeter, Róbert Kasza, & Ádám Marosi)
 Women's Team winners:  (Mhairi Spence, Kate French, & Samantha Murray)
 July 18 – 21: 2013 European Youth "A" Modern Pentathlon Championships in  Saint Petersburg
 Youth Individual winners:  Brice Loubet (m) /  Eilidh Prise (f)
 Youth Men's Team Relay winners:  (Brice Loubet, Stanislas Huet, & Gregory Flayols)
 Youth Women's Team Relay winners:  (Ieva Serapinaitė, Emilija Serapinaitė, & Aurelija Tamasauskaitė)
 Youth Mixed Team Relay winners:  (Alexandra Bettinelli & Christian Zillekens)
 Youth Men's Team winners:  (Marek Grycz, Martin Vlach, & Eizens Poiss)
 Youth Women's Team winners:  (Aurora Tognetti, Irene Prampolini, & Francesca Tognetti)
 September 28 – October 3: 2013 Asian Modern Pentathlon Championships in  Astana
 Individual winners:  Pavel Ilyashenko (m) /  Chen Qian (f)
 Men's Team Relay winners:  (LEE Woo-jin, Jung Jin-hwa, & Hwang Woo-jin)
 Women's Team Relay winners:  (LIANG Wanxia, Zhang Xiaonan, & Chen Qian)
 Mixed Team Relay winners: 
 Men's Team winners:  (Andrey Soldatov, Rustem Sabirkhuzin, & Pavel Ilyashenko)
 Women's Team winners:  (LIANG Wanxia, WANG Wei, & Chen Qian)
 Junior Individual winners:  Kim Dae-beom (m) /  WANG Wei (f)
 November 6 – 11: 2013 South American Modern Pentathlon Championships in  Santiago
 Individual winners:  Esteban Bustos (m) /  Ayelen Zapata (f)
 Mixed Team Relay winners:  (Ayelen Zapata & Emmanuel Zapata)
 Youth Individual winners:  Yan Freitas (m) /  Javiera Rosas (f)

2013 Modern Pentathlon World Cup
 February 20 – 24: MPWC #1 in  Palm Springs
 Individual winners:  Aleksander Lesun (m) /  Victoria Tereshchuk (f)
 Mixed Team Relay winners:  (Leila Gyenesei & Ádám Marosi)
 March 20 – 24: MPWC #2 in  Rio de Janeiro
 Individual winners:  Ádám Marosi (m) /  Margaux Isaksen (f)
 Mixed Team Relay winners:  (Ekaterina Khuraskina & Aleksander Lesun)
 April 17 – 21: MPWC #3 in  Chengdu
 Individual winners:  Pavlo Tymoshchenko (m) /  Ganna Buriak (f)
 Mixed Team Relay winners:  (Hanna Vasilionak & Raman Pinchuk)
 May 8 & 9: MPWC #4 in  Budapest
 Individual winners:  James Cooke (m) /  Ganna Buriak (f)
 Mixed Team Relay winners:  (Leila Gyenesei & Ádám Marosi)
 May 31 – June 2: MPWC #5 (final) in  Nizhny Novgorod
 Individual winners:  Valentin Prades (m) /  Victoria Tereshchuk (f)
 Mixed Team Relay winners:  (Jeļena Rubļevska & Deniss Čerkovskis)

References

External links
 Union Internationale de Pentathlon Moderne Website (UIPM)

 
Modern pentathlon
2013 in sports